Bryan Nelson (born September 14, 1958) was a Republican member of the Florida House of Representatives, representing the 31st District, which includes the cities of Apopka, Eustis, Mount Dora, Tavares, and Umatilla in northern Lake County and northern Orange County, since 2012. He served on the Orange County Commission for District 2 from 2014 until March 2018 when he won election for mayor of Apopka after support for the previous mayor deteriorated.

History
Nelson was born in Orlando and attended the University of Florida, where he graduated with a degree in ornamental horticulture in 1979. After graduation, he returned to Central Florida, where he worked in his family's business, Nelson's Florida Roses. Nelson then started Nelson Insurance Services in 1995 as a means of providing his family's business with insurance, and it expanded from there. In 2002, he was appointed to the Orange County Planning and Zoning Commission, and served as its chairman in 2006.

Florida House of Representatives
When incumbent State Representative Fred Brummer was unable to seek another term in the legislature and instead opted to run for the Orange County Commission, Nelson ran to succeed him in the 38th District, which was based in northern Orange County, stretching from Apopka to Ocoee, Orlando, and Maitland. He won the Republican primary and the general election entirely uncontested. In 2008, he faced his first opponents: Lonnie Thompson, the Democratic nominee, and Lawrence Fisher, an independent candidate. The Orlando Sentinel endorsed Thompson over Nelson, observing, "[H]e better appreciates the important issues facing the district than does his opponent," and criticizing Nelson for not protecting the Wekiva River and for not supporting property-insurance reforms. Despite this fact, Nelson won his second term over Thompson by a solid margin of victory, winning 54% of the vote to Thompson's 43% and Fisher's 3%. When Nelson ran for a third term in 2010, he did not face a Democratic opponent, but instead a member of the Florida Tea Party, James Heinzelman. Nelson ran on a platform of "repealing parts of SB 550, which would impose a five-year inspection schedule on septic tanks," which he said would lead to a "bureaucratic and costly nightmare" and on supporting SunRail, which Heinzeilman vocally opposed. Ultimately, Heinzelman did not prove to be a significant challenge for Nelson, and he won re-election with 82% of the vote. In 2012, when the legislative districts were redrawn, Nelson was moved into the 31st District, which, like his previous district, was based in Apopka, but unlike his previous district, stretched into northern Lake County and won re-election to his fourth term entirely unopposed.

Orange County Commission
In 2013, Nelson announced that he would run for the Orange County Commission in District 2 to replace term-limited Commissioner Fred Brummer, whom he previously replaced in the legislature. He was able to defeat his Democratic opponent, Vice Mayor Alvin Moore, Sr. of Eatonville, Florida in the general election process in 2014.

References

External links
Florida House of Representatives - Bryan Nelson
Nelson for Orange County Commission

1958 births
Living people
Republican Party members of the Florida House of Representatives
People from Orlando, Florida
University of Florida alumni
Mayors of places in Florida